Section 2 of the Constitution of Australia says that there shall be a Governor-General to represent the monarch in Australia.

The Governor-General of the Commonwealth of Australia is the representative in Australia at federal/national level of the Australian monarch (currently King Charles III). The functions and roles of the Governor-General include appointing ambassadors, ministers and judges, giving royal assent to legislation, issuing writs for elections and bestowing honours. The Governor-General is President of the Federal Executive Council and Commander-in-Chief of the Australian Defence Force. All these things are done and all these posts are held under the authority of the Australian Constitution.

The term of office is at the King's pleasure but it is usually 5 years.

References

External links
 Commonwealth of Australia Constitution Act - Sect 2 from AustLII

Australian constitutional law
 
Monarchy in Australia
Parliament of Australia